Randal Chilton Burns is a professor and Chair of the computer science department at Johns Hopkins University. He is a member of the Kavli Neuroscience Discovery Institute, Institute for Data-Intensive Science, Engineering and the Science of Learning Institute and National Academy of Sciences. His research interests lie in building scalable data systems for exploration and analysis of big data.

Education and early career 
Burns graduated from Stanford University in 1993 with a bachelor's degree in geophysics. He earned his master's and doctorate from University of California, Santa Cruz in 1997 and 2000 respectively. He also worked as a research staff member at IBM's Alamden Research Center between 1996-2002.

Research 
Burns's PhD dissertation is titled 'Data Management in a Distributed File System for Storage Area Networks'. He has worked on waste management of unused digital data. He was part of a team along with Alex Szalay and Charles Meneveau which built a 350TB turbulence database that provides access to large computational fluid dynamics simulations. In recent times, his research has focused on neuroscience where he built a cloud based web-service for neuroscience data and enabled better understanding of the human brain.

References 

American computer scientists
University of California, Santa Cruz alumni
Stanford University alumni
Year of birth missing (living people)
Living people